Rashanim is the eponymous debut album by guitarist Jon Madof's Rashanim trio with Shanir Ezra Blumenkranz on bass and Mathias Kunzli on drums released in 2003 on John Zorn's Tzadik Records as part of the Radical Jewish Culture Series.

Reception

JazzTimes reviewer Aaron Steinberg said, "Most of the tunes are Madof originals, though with a number of traditional Klezmer and folk melodies mixed in. They all keep dancing, occasionally dark melodies in common, which Madof handles confidently." He further commented on the pairing of Madof with bassist Shanir Ezra Blumenkranz, saying "[Blumenkranz's] active lines sometimes make a bid for harmolodic balance. The two work so well together, they sometimes leave drummer Mathias Kunzli with little to do". Allmusic rated the album with 4 stars

Track listing 
All compositions by Jon Madof except as indicated
 "Der Khusid Geyt Tantsn" (Traditional) - 3:07 		
 "Chroma" - 5:18
 "Meshek" - 6:56
 "Dovid Melech Yisrael/Lecha Dodi" (Shlomo Carlebach) - 5:24
 "Chanshe's Nign" - 5:05
 "Fel Shara/Üsküdar" (Traditional) - 4:39
 "Dybbuk" - 4:49
 "Brooklyn Dance" - 3:29
 "Passing" - 3:51
 "V'shamru" (Moshe Rothblum) - 6:23
 "Kamancha" (Sayat Nova) - 2:21

Personnel 
 Jon Madof – guitar 
 Shanir Ezra Blumenkranz – electric bass
 Matthias Künzli – drums, percussion

References 

2003 albums
Tzadik Records albums
Jon Madof albums